Rising is the third album by Atlanta rap metal group Stuck Mojo. Unlike the previous two, this album found considerable mainstream success, most likely due to the music video for the song "Rising", which featured WCW members Diamond Dallas Page, Raven and The Flock. This video received considerable airplay as well as being played on WCW Monday Nitro. The WCW United States Championship belt is pictured on the cover.

Rising sold over 3 million copies, becoming Century Media's highest selling album until 2004, when Lacuna Coil's album Comalies broke that record. This album features a slightly larger lean towards hip hop, a notable exception after the aggressive Pigwalk album.

Track listing
"Intro" :30
"Crooked Figurehead" 2:28
"Trick" 4:05
"Assassination of a Pop Star" 3:29
"Rising" 3:52
"Southern Pride" 3:29
"Enemy Territory" 3:39
"Back in the Saddle" 4:43
"Dry" 3:16
"Throw the Switch" 3:25
"Hang 'Em High (Loser's Theme)" 3:07
"Tears" 3:14
"Pipebomb" 3:49
"Suburban Ranger" (bonus track) 5:58

References

1998 albums
Stuck Mojo albums
Century Media Records albums
Albums produced by Andy Sneap
World Championship Wrestling